The 2000 congressional elections in Minnesota were held on November 7, 2000 to determine who would represent the state of Minnesota in the United States House of Representatives.

Minnesota had eight seats in the House, apportioned according to the 1990 United States Census.  Representatives are elected for two-year terms; those elected served in the 107th Congress from January 3, 2001 until January 3, 2003.  The election coincided with the 2000 presidential election and the 2000 U.S. Senate election.

Except for DFLer David Minge of the 2nd congressional district, all other House incumbents from Minnesota who stood for reelection were reelected. Minge's seat came under the control of the Republican Party of Minnesota as a result of the 2000 election. DFL incumbent Bruce Vento of the 4th congressional district died in office less than a month prior to the election; however, he was not seeking reelection, and the DFL nominee running for election to replace him, Betty McCollum, was able to keep the seat in the DFL's hands.

Overview

District 1

Incumbent Republican Gil Gutknecht, who had represented Minnesota's 1st congressional district since 1994, ran against Mary Rieder of the DFL and Rich Osness of the Libertarian Party. Gutknecht won a fourth term, defeating second-place Rieder by a landslide margin of nearly 15 percent, as Osness placed at a very distant third.

DFL primary

Candidates
 Mary Rieder

Results

Republican primary

Candidates
 Gil Gutknecht, incumbent U.S. Representative since 1994

Results

General election

Results

District 2

Incumbent DFLer David Minge, who was first elected in 1992, ran against Mark Kennedy of the Republican Party, Gerald W. Brekke of the Independence Party, Ron Helwig of the Libertarian Party, and Dennis A. Burda of the Constitution Party. Kennedy dashed Minge's hopes for a fifth term, defeating the incumbent by a razor-thin margin of six one hundredths of one percent of the vote, while Brekke finished a very distant third, and Helwig and Burda, respectively, finished an even more distant fourth and fifth.

Constitution Party primary

Candidates
 Dennis A. Burda

Results

DFL primary

Candidates
 David Minge, incumbent U.S. Representative since 1993

Results

Independence primary

Candidates
 Stan Bentz
 Gerald W. Brekke

Results

Republican primary

Candidates
 Mark Kennedy, business executive
 Joe Wagner

Results

General election

Results

District 3

Incumbent Republican Jim Ramstad, who was first elected in 1990, faced off against Sue Shuff of the DFL, Bob Odden of the Libertarian Party, and Arne Niska of the Constitution Party. Ramstad had no difficulty winning a sixth term in Congress, as he defeated Shuff by a 37.79 percent margin, while Odden finished a distant third and Niska finished slightly behind Odden.

Constitution Party primary

Candidates
 Arne Niska

Results

DFL primary

Candidates
 Sue Shuff
 Darryl Tyree Stanton

Results

Republican primary

Candidates
 Jim Ramstad, incumbent U.S. Representative since 1991

Results

General election

Results

District 4

Incumbent DFLer Bruce Vento died in office on October 10, 2000, less than a month before the election. However, as Vento was not seeking reelection, it was not necessary for any special election to be held or for the DFL to select another candidate. Betty McCollum had been selected in the DFL primary to seek election to replace Vento. Opposing McCollum were Linda Runbeck of the Republican Party, Tom Foley of the Independence Party, and Nicholas Skrivanek of the Constitution Party.

McCollum did not face any great difficulty keeping the seat (which represented a very liberal population centered around St. Paul) in DFL hands. McCollum defeated Runbeck by a margin of more than 17 percent of the vote. Due to a surprisingly strong showing by Foley (who finished about 10 percent behind Runbeck), McCollum was able to win by such a large margin while simultaneously failing to secure a majority of the vote.

Constitution Party primary

Candidates
 Nicholas Skrivanek

Results

DFL primary

Candidates
 Chris Coleman, St. Paul City Councilor since 1997
 Cathie Hartnett
 Betty McCollum, State Representative from district 55B since 1993
 Steven G. Novak, State Senator from district 52 since 1983

Results

Independence primary

Candidates
 Pam (Pamela Joy) Ellison
 Tom Foley

Results

Republican primary

Candidates
 Patricia Reagan
 Linda Runbeck, State Senator from district 53 since 1993

Results

General election

Results

District 5

Incumbent DFLer Martin Sabo, who was first elected in 1978, faced absolutely no difficulty in winning his 12th term as the representative of the very liberal 5th congressional district, which was centered around Minneapolis. Although he was faced, in the general election, with a very crowded field of challengers, Sabo was able to win over 69 percent of the vote, and defeated second-place Republican Frank Taylor by an overwhelming 46.42 percent margin.

Constitution Party primary

Candidates
 Renee Lavoi

Results

DFL primary

Candidates
 Martin Olav Sabo, incumbent U.S. Representative since 1979

Results

Independence primary

Candidates
 Rob Tomich

Results

Republican primary

Candidates
 Chris Flynn
 Frank Taylor

Results

General election

Results

District 6

Incumbent Democrat Bill Luther, who was first elected as the U.S. representative from the 6th congressional district in 1994, faced an extremely close challenge in 2000. Luther won reelection for his fourth term in Congress by a razor-thin margin, defeating Republican challenger John Kline by a margin of just 1.53 percent of the vote.

Constitution Party primary

Candidates
 Ralph A. Hubbard

Results

DFL primary

Candidates
 Bill Luther, incumbent U.S. Representative since 1995

Results

Republican primary

Candidates
 John Kline, retired Colonel (USMC)

Results

General election

Results

District 7

Incumbent DFLer Collin Peterson, who was first elected in 1990, faced no difficulty winning his eighth term in Congress, defeating Republican challenger Glen Menze by a landslide 39.41 percent margin.

Constitution Party primary

Candidates
 Owen Sivertson

Results

DFL primary

Candidates
 Collin C. Peterson, incumbent U.S. Representative since 1991

Results

Republican primary

Candidates
 Aleta Edin
 Glen Menze

Results

General election

Results

District 8

Incumbent DFLer Jim Oberstar, who was first elected in 1974, had no difficulty winning his 14th term in Congress, defeating Republican challenger Bob Lemen by a margin of more than 42 percent.

DFL primary

Candidates
 James L. Oberstar, incumbent U.S. Representative since 1975

Results

Republican primary

Candidates
 Bob Lemen
 Warren L. Nelson

Results

General election

Results

References

2000
Minnesota
2000 Minnesota elections